Champions League 2017 may refer to:

 2017 AFC Champions League
 2017 CAF Champions League
 2016–17 UEFA Champions League
 2017–18 UEFA Champions League
 2016–17 CONCACAF Champions League